The New Culture Movement was a movement in China in the 1910s and 1920s that criticized classical Chinese ideas and promoted a new Chinese culture based upon progressive, modern ideals like elections and science. Arising out of disillusionment with traditional Chinese culture following the failure of the Republic of China to address China's problems, it featured scholars such as Chen Duxiu, Cai Yuanpei, Chen Hengzhe, Li Dazhao, Lu Xun, Zhou Zuoren, He Dong, Qian Xuantong, Liu Bannong, Bing Xin, and Hu Shih, many classically educated, who led a revolt against Confucianism. The movement was launched by the writers of New Youth magazine, where these intellectuals promoted a new society based on unconstrained individuals rather than the traditional Confucian system. The movement promoted:

 Vernacular literature
 An end to the patriarchal family in favor of individual freedom and women's liberation
 The view that China is a nation among nations, not a uniquely Confucian culture
 The re-examination of Confucian texts and ancient classics using modern textual and critical methods, known as the Doubting Antiquity School
 Democratic and egalitarian values
 An orientation to the future rather than the past

The New Culture Movement was the progenitor of the May Fourth Movement. On 4 May 1919, students in Beijing aligned with the movement protested the transfer of German rights over Jiaozhou Bay to Imperial Japan rather than China at the Paris Peace Conference (the meeting setting the terms of peace at the conclusion of World War I), transforming what had been a cultural movement into a political one.

History 

Two major centers of literature and intellectual activity were Beijing, home to Peking University and Tsinghua University, and Shanghai, with its flourishing publishing sector. The founders of the New Culture Movement clustered in Peking University, where they were recruited by Cai Yuanpei when he became chancellor. Chen Duxiu as dean, and Li Dazhao as librarian in turn recruited leading figures such as the philosopher Hu Shih, the scholar of Buddhism Liang Shuming, the historian Gu Jiegang, and many more. Chen founded the journal New Youth in 1915, which became the most prominent of hundreds of new publications for the new middle-class public. Xin wenhua yundong (New Culture Movement) emerged after Chen Duxiu published his recommendations of what cultural modernity should be in the 1920s. Some of the most influential manifestos to help instigate the movement were titled: "To Youth" ( 敬告青年 "jinggao qingnian"), "1916" (一九一六年 "yijiuyiliu nian"), and "Our Final Realization" (吾人最後之覺悟 "wuren zuihou zhi juewu").

Contributions

Yuan Shikai 
Yuan Shikai, who inherited part of the Qing dynasty military after it collapsed in 1911, attempted to establish order and unity, but he failed to protect China against Japan, and also failed in an attempt to have himself declared emperor. When he died in 1916, the collapse of the traditional order seemed complete, and there was an intensified search for a replacement to go deeper than the changes of the previous generations, which brought new institutions and new political forms. Daring leaders called for a new culture.

Chen Duxiu 
A substantial literary establishment, publishing houses, journals, literary societies, and universities, provided a foundation for an active literary, and intellectual scene over the course of the following decades. The New Youth journal, which was a leading forum for debating the causes of China's weakness, as it laid the blame on Confucian culture. Chen Duxiu called for "Mr. Confucius" to be replaced by "Mr. Science" and "Mr. Democracy". These two were regarded as the two symbols of the New Culture Movement and also its legacy.

Hu Shih 
Another outcome was the promotion of written vernacular Chinese over literary or classical Chinese. The restructuring of national heritage first began when Hu Shih replaced traditional Confucian learning with a more modern construction of research on traditional culture. Hu Shih proclaimed that "a dead language cannot produce a living literature." In theory, the new format allowed people with little education to read texts, articles and books. He charged that literary, or Classical Chinese, which had been the written language prior to the movement, was understood by only scholars and officials (ironically, the new vernacular included many foreign words and Japanese neologisms (Wasei-kango), which made it difficult for many to read). Scholars, such as Y.R. Chao (Zhao Yuanren), began the study of the Chinese language and dialects using tools of foreign linguistics. Hu Shih was among the scholars who used the textual study of Dream of the Red Chamber and other vernacular fiction as the basis for the national language. Literary societies such as the Crescent Moon Society flourished. Hu Shih was not only one of the founders of the movement but also considered the leader of the vernacular faction with his promotion of scientific methods.

Lu Xun 
The literary output of this time was substantial, with many writers who later became famous (such as Mao Dun, Lao She, Lu Xun and Bing Xin) publishing their first works. For example, Lu Xun's essays and short fiction created a sensation with their condemnation of Confucian culture. "Diary of a Madman" directly implied that China's traditional culture was cannibalistic, and The True Story of Ah Q showed typical Chinese people  as weak and self-deceiving. Along with this musicians such as Yin Zizhong joined the movement through music.

Foreign influence 
New Culture leaders and their followers now saw China as a nation among nations, not as culturally unique. A large number of foreign doctrines became fashionable, particularly those that reinforced the cultural criticism and nation-building impulses of the movement. Social Darwinism, which had been influential since the late nineteenth century, was especially shaping for Lu Xun, among many others, and was supplemented by almost every "ism" of the world. Cai Yuanpei, Li Shizeng, and Wu Zhihui developed a Chinese variety of anarchism. They argued that Chinese society had to undergo radical social change before political change would be meaningful.  The pragmatism of John Dewey became popular, often through the work of Hu Shih, Chiang Monlin, and Tao Xingzhi. Dewey arrived in China in 1919, and spent the following year lecturing. Bertrand Russell also lectured widely to warm crowds. Lu Xun was associated with the ideas of Nietzsche, which were also propagated by Li Shicen, Mao Dun, and many other intellectuals of the time.

New Culture leaders, often under the influence of the anarchist program, promoted feminism, even free love, as an attack on the traditional family, changing the terms in which the following generations conceived society. More specifically, the movement replaced sexuality over the traditional Chinese idea of kinship positionality. The substitution is a staple of the emerging individualistic theories that occurred during the era. Among the feminist writers was Ding Ling.

Development and end of the movement 
When Cai Yuanpei, the principal of Beijing university, resigned on May 9, 1919 it had caused a huge uproar in the media across the country. This connected the academic discourse within the university with the political activism of the May Fourth demonstrations. The May Fourth Demonstrations of 1919 initially united the leaders but soon, there was a debate and falling out over the role of politics. Hu Shih, Cai Yuanpei, and other liberals urged the demonstrating students to return to the classroom, but Chen Duxiu and Li Dazhao, frustrated with the inadequacy of cultural change, urged more radical political action. They used their roles as Peking University faculty to organize Marxist study groups and the first meeting of the Chinese Communist Party. 

Li called for "fundamental solutions," but Hu criticized it as abstract, calling for "more study of questions, less study of isms." The younger followers who followed Li and Chen into organized politics included Mao Zedong.

Other students heeded Hu Shih's call to return to their studies. The new approaches shaped scholarship for the next generation. The historian Gu Jiegang, for instance, pioneered the application of the New History he studied at Columbia University to classical Chinese texts in the Doubting Antiquity Movement. Gu also inspired his students in the study of Chinese folk traditions which had been ignored or dismissed by Confucian scholars. Education was high on the New Culture agenda. Cai Yuanpei headed a New Education Society, and university students joined the Mass Education Movement of James Yen and Tao Xingzhi which promoted literacy as a foundation for wider political participation.

Journalism and public opinion 
Chinese newspaper journalism was modernized in the 1920s according to international standards, thanks to the influence of the New Culture Movement. The roles of journalist and editor were professionalized and became prestigious careers. The business side gained importance and with a greater emphasis on advertising and commercial news, the main papers in Shanghai such as Shenbao, moved away from the advocacy journalism that characterized the 1911 revolutionary period. Much of what they reported shaped narratives and realities amongst those who were interested in what was becoming the New Culture Movement. Outside the main centers the nationalism promoted in metropolitan dailies was not as distinctive as localism and culturalism.

In 1924, Indian Nobel Laureate Rabindranath Tagore held numerous lectures in China. He argued that China could encounter trouble by integrating too much progressive and foreign thoughts into Chinese society. Liberal ideals were a major component of the New Culture Movement. Democracy became a vital tool for those frustrated with the unstable condition of China whereas science became a crucial instrument to discard the "darkness of ignorance and superstition."

New Culture intellectuals advocated and debated a wide range of cosmopolitan solutions that included science, technology, individualism, music and democracy, leaving to the future the question of what organization or political power could carry them out. The anti-imperialist and populist violence of the mid-1920s soon overwhelmed New Culture intellectual inquiry and culture.

Evaluations and changing views 
Orthodox historians viewed the New Culture Movement as a revolutionary break with feudal thought and social practice and the seedbed of revolutionary leaders who created the Chinese Communist Party and went on to found the People's Republic of China in 1949. Mao Zedong wrote that the May 4th Movement "marked a new stage in China's bourgeois-democratic revolution against imperialism and feudalism" and argued that "a powerful camp made its appearance in the bourgeois-democratic revolution, a camp consisting of the working class, the student masses and the new national bourgeoisie."

Historians in the west also saw the movement as marking a break between tradition and modernity, but in recent decades, Chinese and foreign historians now commonly argue that the changes promoted by New Culture leaders had roots going back several generations and thus were not a sharp break with tradition, which, in any case, was quite varied, as much as an acceleration of earlier trends. Research over the last fifty years also suggests that while radical Marxists were important in the New Culture Movement, there were many other influential leaders, including anarchists, conservatives, Christians, and liberals.

The re-evaluation, while it does not challenge the high evaluation of the thinkers and writers of the period, does not accept their self-image as cultural revolutionaries.

Other historians further argue that Mao's communist revolution did not, as it claimed, fulfill the promise of New Culture and enlightenment but rather betrayed its spirit of independent expression and cosmopolitanism. Yu Yingshi, a student of the New Confucian Qian Mu, recently defended Confucian thought against the New Culture condemnation. He reasoned that late imperial China had not been stagnant, irrational and isolated, conditions that would justify radical revolution, but that late Qing thinkers were already taking advantage of the creative potential of Confucius.

Xu Jilin, a Shanghai intellectual who reflects liberal voices, agreed in effect with the orthodox view that the New Culture Movement was the root of the Chinese Revolution but valued the outcome differently. New Culture intellectuals, said Xu, saw a conflict between nationalism and cosmopolitanism in their struggle to find a "rational patriotism," but the cosmopolitan movement of the 1920s was replaced by a "new age of nationalism." Like a "wild horse," Xu continued, "jingoism, once unbridled, could no longer be restrained, thus laying the foundations for the eventual outcomes of the history of China during the first half of the twentieth century."

See also 
 New Life Movement (1934)

References

Bibliography 
 Guy Alitto, The Last Confucian: Liang Shu-Ming and the Chinese Dilemma of Modernity (Berkeley: University of California Press, 1979). Biography of a conservative New Culture figure.
 Kai-wing Chow, Beyond the May Fourth Paradigm: In Search of Chinese Modernity (Lanham: Lexington Books/Rowman & Littlefied, 2008). Essays on new aspects of the movement, including an Introduction which reviews recent re-thinking.
 Chow Tse-tsung, The May Fourth Movement. Cambridge MA: Harvard University Press, 1960. Standard comprehensive survey and analysis.
  Revisionist study showing the influence of anarchist programs.
 Doleželová-Velingerová, Milena, Oldřich Král, and Graham Martin Sanders, eds. The Appropriation of Cultural Capital: China’s May Fourth Project. Cambridge, Massachusetts: Harvard University Asia Center, 2001. Revisionist study.
 Jerome B. Grieder, Hu Shih and the Chinese Renaissance; Liberalism in the Chinese Revolution, 1917-1937 (Cambridge,: Harvard University Press, 1970). Careful study of central figure.
 Hayford, Charles W., To the People: James Yen and Village China. New York: Columbia University Press, 1990. Early chapters describe the role of popular education in the New Culture.
 Lanza, Fabio, Behind the Gate: Inventing Students in Beijing. New York: Columbia University Press, 2010. . Study of student culture and institutions during the New Culture period.
 Leo Ou-fan Lee, Voices from the Iron House : A Study of Lu Xun (Bloomington: Indiana University Press, 1987). Biography and literary analysis.
 Yusheng Lin, The Crisis of Chinese Consciousness: Radical Antitraditionalism in the May Fourth Era (Madison: University of Wisconsin Press, 1979). Early critique of the New Culture Movement as "iconoclastic."
 Manela, Erez. The Wilsonian Moment: Self-Determination and the International Origins of Anticolonial Nationalism. Oxford and New York: Oxford University Press, 2007. Describes the global influences on Chinese youth.
 Maurice J. Meisner, Li Ta-Chao and the Origins of Chinese Marxism (Cambridge,: Harvard University Press, 1967). Intellectual biography of key leader and co-founder of Chinese Communist Party.
 Rana Mitter, A Bitter Revolution: China's Struggle with the Modern World (Oxford; New York: Oxford University Press, 2004). Traces the fate of New Culture ideals through the rest of the century.
 Schwarcz, Vera. The Chinese Enlightenment: Intellectuals and the Legacy of the May Fourth Movement of 1919. Berkeley: University of California Press, 1986. Argues that May Fourth ideals were betrayed.
 Schwartz, Benjamin. "Themes in Intellectual History: May Fourth and After." In Cambridge History of China, Vol. 12, pt. 1: Republican China, 1912–1949, 406–504. Cambridge, U.K.: Cambridge University Press, 1983. Overview of intellectual and cultural history.
 Patrick Fuliang Shan,Yuan Shikai: A Reappraisal, UBC Press, 2018.
 Spence, Jonathan D. The Gate of Heavenly Peace: The Chinese and Their Revolution, 1895-1980. Includes many New Culture leaders and their experience of revolution.
 Zarrow, Peter. Anarchism and Chinese Political Culture (New York: Columbia University Press, 1990).

External links 
 "The May Fourth Spirit, Now and Then", China Heritage Quarterly, 17 (March 2009) – selection of opinions and views on the May Fourth and New Culture Movements from the 1920s to the present.

Chinese literary movements
1910s in China
1920s in China
Lu Xun
Liberalism in China
Communism in China
Anti-Confucianism